Zangoora – The Gypsy Prince is the first Bollywood musical. It was premiered on 23 September 2010 at Nautanki Mahal of Kingdom of Dreams, Gurgaon. It has a cast of 110 members with Hussain Kuwajerwala, Gauahar Khan, Kashmira Irani and Sadanand Patil playing lead, supported by Arjun Fauzdar; besides crew of 250 people. In June 2013, the musical completed a run of 1000 shows, and became the longest running Bollywood stage show in India.

The musical was a production of the Great Indian Nautanki Company, a joint venture between Wizcraft and APRA Group. The music of the musical was composed by  Shankar–Ehsaan–Loy, with screenplay and dialogues by Javed Akhtar.

Overview

It stars Hussain Kuwajerwala, Gauahar Khan, Kashmira Irani, Sadanand Patil and Arjun Fauzdar. A special preview was held on the inauguration of the Kingdom of Dreams, entertainment and leisure destination on 18 September 2010. Music is composed by leading Bollywood composers, Shankar–Ehsaan–Loy, the story, screenplay and dialogues are by  Javed Akhtar, Dance direction and choreography by Shiamak Davar, costumes by Neeta Lulla while stunt direction by Alan Amin and also employs a crew of 250 people.

The cast was part of the launch of the 2010 Commonwealth Games’  official theme song, Jiyo Utho Bado Jeeto by composer A R Rahman, and later the 2010 Commonwealth Games opening ceremony.

In June 2013, the musical completed over a 1000 successful shows at Nautanki Mahal, Gurgaon.

Cast
 Zangoora - Hussain Kuwajerwala/Vishay Singh / Rachit Bahal / Pankaj Sharma / Md. Shahidur 
 Lachi - Gauahar Khan/Annukampa Harsh/Rachaittri Gupta 
 Sonali - Kashmira Irani/Rea Krishna/Sukhmani Lamba/Suparna Moitra/Karamjeet Madonna
 Zorawar - Sadanand Patil/Nitin Goel
 Daulatrai - Sanjeev Ahuja / srikant
 Todarmal - Manoj Rajput / sushil Sharma
 Chambuti - Padamshree C R / Nidhi Mishra
 Jaalpa-  / Hema Bisht / Nidhi Mishra
 Manglu - Arjun Fauzdar

Crew
 Story & Screenplay : Javed Akhtar 
 Music: Shankar–Ehsaan–Loy
 Choreography: Shiamak Davar & Glen D'Mello
 Costumes: Neeta Lulla
 Art Direction & Production Design: Omung Kumar, Vanita Kumar 
 Dialogues: Anindita Menon
 Background Score: Nikhil Koparde

Music
The soundtrack of the musical has been composed by  Bollywood composing trio, Shankar–Ehsaan–Loy. Apart from special songs, the musical also included 20 hit Bollywood songs like "Pehla Nasha Pehla Khumar" (Jo Jeeta Wohi Sikandar), "Baware Baware" (Luck by Chance), "Choli Ke Peeche Kya Hai" (Khalnayak) and "Mehbooba Mehbooba" (Sholay).

References

External links
 Zangoora at Kingdom of Dreams, official website

Hindi cinema
2010 musicals
Gurgaon
Hindi theatre
Indian musicals